Fort Warren was a fort located in Castleton, Vermont, built in 1779. American troops during the American Revolution retreated to Castleton after the loss of Ticonderoga). (Vermont Historic Sites Comm.) Fort Warren was then built as part of a line of forts used to defend Vermont.

Works cited

Vermont Historic Sites Commission. "Fort Warren." Historic site marker. (n.d.) 

Warren
Buildings and structures in Castleton, Vermont
1779 establishments in Vermont